The letter of the law and the spirit of the law are two possible ways to regard rules, or laws. To obey the letter of the law is to follow the literal reading of the words of the law, whereas following the spirit of the law means enacting the intent behind the law. Although it is usual to follow both the letter and the spirit, the two are commonly referenced when they are in opposition. "Law" originally referred to legislative statute, but in the idiom may refer to any kind of rule. 

Intentionally following the letter of the law but not the spirit may be accomplished through exploiting technicalities, loopholes, and ambiguous language. Rules as written (RAW) versus rules as intended (RAI) is a similar expression originating from the tabletop role-playing game community.

Legal research 
Violating the perceived intention of the law has been found to affect people's judgments of culpability above and beyond violations of the letter of the law such that (1) a person can violate the letter of the law (but not the spirit) and not incur culpability, (2) a person can violate the spirit of the law and incur culpability, even without violating the letter of the law, and (3) the greatest culpability is assigned when both the letter and the spirit of the law are violated.

Shakespeare 

William Shakespeare wrote numerous plays dealing with the letter-versus-spirit antithesis, almost always coming down on the side of "spirit", often forcing villains (who  always sided with the letter) to make concessions and remedy.  In one of the best known examples, The Merchant of Venice, he introduces the quibble as a plot device to save both the spirit and the letter of the law. The moneylender Shylock has made an agreement with Antonio that if he cannot repay a loan, he will have a pound of flesh from him. When the debt is not repaid in time Portia at first pleads for mercy in a famous speech: "The quality of mercy is not strain'd, It droppeth as the gentle rain from heaven Upon the place beneath. It is twice blest: It blesseth him that gives and him that takes." (IV,i,185). When Shylock refuses, she finally saves Antonio by pointing out that Shylock's agreement with him mentioned no blood, and therefore Shylock can have his pound of flesh only if he sheds no blood.

U.S. constitutional law 

Interpretations of the U.S. Constitution have historically divided on the "letter versus spirit" debate. For example, at the founding, the Federalist Party argued for a looser interpretation of the Constitution, granting Congress broad powers in keeping with the spirit of the broader purpose of some founders (notably including the Federalist founders' purposes). The Federalists would have represented the "spirit" aspect. In contrast, the Democratic-Republicans, who favored a limited federal government, argued for the strict interpretation of the Constitution, arguing that the federal government was granted only those powers enumerated in the Constitution, and nothing not explicitly stated; they represented the "letter" interpretation.

Modern constitutional interpretation also divides on these lines. Currently, Living Constitution scholars advocate a "spirit"-esque interpretative strategy, although one grounded in a spirit that reflects broad powers. Originalist or Textualist scholars advocate a more "letter"-based approach, arguing that the Amendment process of the Constitution necessarily forecloses broader interpretations that can be accomplished by passing an amendment.

The Bible 

The 1st century letter of Saint Paul to the Corinthians (specifically 2 Corinthians 3:6) refers to the spirit and letter of the law. Though it is not quoted directly, the principle is applied using the words "spirit" and "letter" in context with the legalistic view of the Hebrew Bible. This is the first recorded use of the phrase.

In the New Testament, Pharisees are seen as people who place the letter of the law above the spirit (Mark).  Thus, "Pharisee" has entered the language as a pejorative for one who does so; the Oxford English Dictionary defines 'Pharisee' with one of the meanings as "A person of the spirit or character commonly attributed to the Pharisees in the New Testament; a legalist or formalist". Pharisees are also depicted as being lawless or corrupt (Matthew ); the Greek word used in the verse means lawlessness, and the corresponding Hebrew word means fraud or injustice. However, the Hebrew word "Perushim" from which "Pharisee" is derived, actually means "separatists", referencing their focus on spiritual needs versus worldly pleasures.

In the Gospels, Jesus is often shown as being critical of Pharisees. He is more like the Essenes than the other Jewish groups of the time (Sadducees, Pharisees, Zealots); however, the Pharisees, like Jesus, believed in the resurrection of the dead, and in divine judgment. They advocated prayer, almsgiving and fasting as spiritual practices. The Pharisees were those who were trying to be faithful to the law given to them by God. Not all Pharisees, nor all Jews of that time, were legalistic. Though modern language has used the word Pharisee in the pejorative to describe someone who is legalistic and rigid, it is not an accurate description of all Pharisees. The argument over the "Spirit of the Law" vs. the "Letter of the Law" was part of early Jewish dialogue as well.

The Parable of the Good Samaritan is one of the New Testament texts to address this theme. The passage concerns a dialogue between Jesus and an "expert in the law" or "lawyer". As described in verse 25 ("a certain lawyer stood up and tested Him saying, Teacher what must I do to inherit eternal life?," NKJV), the intent of the dialogue was to trap Jesus into making statements contrary to the law. The question "Who is my neighbor?", that follows in verse 29, is described as being asked with the goal of self-justification.

It is then that Jesus responds with the story of a man beaten by robbers who is ignored by a Priest and a Levite, but then rescued and compassionately cared for by a Samaritan. Priests and Levites were Israelites whose qualifications and duties were very meticulously set forth in Mosaic law, (Leviticus 10, and Numbers 5-8) while Samaritans were descended from Israelites who had intermarried with their Babylonian captives and had been forced to establish a sect with an alternative interpretation of the Law. In the story, both the Priest and Levite follow their prescribed regulations dutifully, yet do not help the injured traveler, even crossing to the other side of the road to avoid possible rule violations. The Samaritan, whose very existence is based on a refutation of Jewish law, (specifically those post-Pentateuchal biblical books that identify Mount Moriah as the proper place of worship specified in Deuteronomy 12; the Samaritans considered only the Pentateuch canon, and worshipped Yahweh in their temple on Mount Gerizim) goes above and beyond simply tending to the injured man. He takes him to an inn and gives money for the man's care, promises and then actually does return to inquire about the man, and pay any overage incurred. Jesus concludes by asking the lawyer which of the men was a "neighbor" to the beaten traveller, to which the reply was "the one who showed compassion". Then Jesus says to him "go and do likewise".

According to Jeremiah, "the qualities of the new covenant expounded upon  the old are: a) It will not be broken; b) Its law will be written in the heart, not merely on tablets of stone; c) The knowledge of God will deem it no longer necessary to put it into written words of instruction." According to Luke, and Paul, in the first epistle to the Corinthians, this prophecy was fulfilled only through the work of Jesus Christ, who said "This cup is the new covenant in my blood, which will be shed for you." Christ did not come to abolish the law but to fulfill it. His purpose was to encourage people to look beyond the "letter of the law" to the "spirit of the law"...the principles behind the commandments and the law's intention. Jesus quotes the book of Deuteronomy and Leviticus: "All the Law can be summed up in this: to love God with all your heart, all your mind and all your soul, and to love your neighbor as yourself" (paraphrased).

Gaming the system 

Gaming the system, also called "rules lawyering", is a pejorative phrase applied to someone who follows the letter of the law to obtain an outcome the speaker finds immoral or contrary to the spirit of the law.  There are two reasons why this can be possible.  A body of law may have been formulated in a way that permits ambiguity, or else there may be limitations in the law's scope or jurisdiction. For example, an offshore bank account can be used to reduce domestic tax obligations in some countries.

See also 
Law

Expounding of the Law
Golden rule (law) • Literal rule • Mischief rule • Purposive approach
Legal abuse
Legal fiction
Legal opportunism
Legal technicality
 Original intent • Original meaning • Textualism

The Spirit of Law, the 1748 political theory treatise by Montesquieu
United States v. Kirby

Language
Sense and reference

Others
Gaming the system
Loophole
Malicious compliance • Work-to-rule
Positive law • Natural law

References 

English phrases
Philosophy of law
Abuse of the legal system
Mosaic law in Christian theology